Irma Maria Rosnell (20 February 1927 – 19 February 2022) was a Finnish politician. A member of the Finnish People's Democratic League, she served in the Parliament of Finland from 1954 to 1987. She died in Pori on 19 February 2022, at the age of 94.

References

1927 births
2022 deaths
20th-century Finnish women politicians
People from Pori
University of Helsinki alumni
Finnish People's Democratic League politicians
Democratic Alternative (Finland) politicians
Members of the Parliament of Finland (1954–58)
Members of the Parliament of Finland (1958–62)
Members of the Parliament of Finland (1962–66)
Members of the Parliament of Finland (1966–70)
Members of the Parliament of Finland (1970–72)
Members of the Parliament of Finland (1972–75)
Members of the Parliament of Finland (1975–79)
Members of the Parliament of Finland (1979–83)
Members of the Parliament of Finland (1983–87)